Marcy Hinzmann-Simpson (born May 26, 1982) is an American former competitive pair skater. With Aaron Parchem, she is the 2006 U.S. national silver medalist and competed at the 2006 Winter Olympics.

Personal life
Marcy Hinzmann was born May 26, 1982 in Norman, Oklahoma, the eldest of three children. Her mother is from Venezuela. Hinzmann is married to former NHL hockey player Todd Simpson and settled in Kelowna, BC.

Career
Hinzmann began skating at age eight. As a singles skater, she was coached by Carol Heiss Jenkins. After switching to pairs, she skated with Ronnie Biancosino from around 2000 to 2002 and then with Steve Hartsell for one season.

Hinzmann teamed up with Aaron Parchem in 2003. She tore the anterior cruciate ligament in her left knee during a practice in August 2004 and skated with the injury during the season. She underwent surgery following the U.S. Championships in January 2005 and was off the ice for four months.

The pair won the bronze medal at the 2005 U.S. Championships and silver in 2006. They were selected to represent the United States at the 2006 Winter Olympics, where they finished 13th. The pair then placed 11th at the 2006 World Championships.

Hinzmann ended her competitive career on May 30, 2006, and went on to skate professionally with Lee Harris on cruise ships and in gala shows. She participated in the third season of the Canadian television show Battle of the Blades, partnered with Todd Simpson.

Programs
(with Parchem)

Results

With Parchem

With Hartsell

With Biancosino

References

External links 
 
 
 U.S. Olympic Team bio
 Chiller Staff Page

American female pair skaters
American sportspeople of Venezuelan descent
Figure skaters at the 2006 Winter Olympics
Living people
Olympic figure skaters of the United States
1982 births
Battle of the Blades participants
Sportspeople from Norman, Oklahoma
21st-century American women
20th-century American women